The ninth and final season of the Canadian television comedy series Video on Trial premiered on Much on June 8, 2014 and concluded on July 6, 2014. It consists of four episodes.

Production
For the ninth season of Video on Trial, the series was drastically revamped. Aisha Alfa and Paul Lemieux star in the new version. The short-lived season introduced a strictly controlled format featuring reoccurring sketches and segments, until being cancelled by Much's corporate parent Bell Media on July 11, 2014, officially announced as part of an internal job reduction but most likely due to a change in broadcasting policies.

Episodes

References

2014 Canadian television seasons